The State Register of Heritage Places is maintained by the Heritage Council of Western Australia. , 1,032 places are heritage-listed in the City of Perth, of which 226 are on the State Register of Heritage Places.

List
The Western Australian State Register of Heritage Places, lists the following 226 state registered places within the City of Perth:

Former places
The following place has been removed from the State Register of Heritage Places within the City of Perth:

Notes

 No coordinates specified by Inherit database

 † Denotes building has been demolished

Notes

References

Perth